Sylvan Lake may refer to:

Communities
 Sylvan Lake, Alberta, Canada
 Sylvan Lake, Michigan, United States
 Sylvan Lake, New York, United States

Lakes
 Sylvan Lake (Alberta), Canada
 Sylvan Lake (Colorado), United States
 Sylvan Lake (Florida), United States
 Sylvan Lake (Indiana), United States
 Sylvan Lake (Cass County, Minnesota), United States
 Sylvan Lake (Grant County, Minnesota), United States
 Sylvan Lake (New Jersey), United States
 Sylvan Lake (Montana), Sanders County, Montana, United States
 Sylvan Lake (New York), United States
 Sylvan Lake (South Dakota), United States
 Lake Sylvan (New Zealand), near Paradise

See also
 Silvan Lake, a lake in Georgia